Joya is the fifth studio album by American musician Will Oldham. It was released on Drag City in 1997 as the first album billed to his name, rather than the Palace or Bonnie "Prince" Billy monikers. It also features Bob Arellano, Colin Gagon, and David Pajo.

In 2007, when the album became available for download through iTunes, the artist credit was changed to Bonnie "Prince" Billy, with altered artwork reflecting the change.

Critical reception

Stephen Thomas Erlewine of AllMusic gave the album 4 out of 5 stars, saying, "it's a promising, ultimately unfulfilling record that doesn't quite prove whether Oldham is a songwriter of pretense or genuine talent." Rob O'Connor of Entertainment Weekly gave the album a B+ grade, calling it "hypnotic and sublimely bizarre."

Track listing

Personnel
Credits adapted from liner notes.

 Bob Arellano – music
 Colin Gagon – music
 Will Oldham – music
 David Pajo – music
 Dan Koretzky – production
 Rian Murphy – production
 Chris Shepard – engineering
 Ubaldo Tirado – engineering
 Konrad Strauss – mastering
 Joe Oldham – photography
 Bryan Rich – photography
 Dan Osborn – layout

References

External links
 

1997 albums
Will Oldham albums
Drag City (record label) albums